Cumhuriyet means "republic" in Turkish. It may refer to:

Cumhuriyet, a daily newspaper in Turkey
Cumhuriyet University, a public university in Sivas Province, Turkey
 Cumhuriyet (The Republic (film)), 1998 Turkish film

Places
Cumhuriyet, Çay, a village in the district of Çay, Afyonkarahisar Province, Turkey 
Cumhuriyet, Dinar, a village in the district of Dinar, Afyonkarahisar Province, Turkey
Cumhuriyet, Gülağaç, a village in the district of Gülağaç, Aksaray Province, Turkey
Cumhuriyet, Karakoçan
Cumhuriyet, Kayapınar
Cumhuriyet, Manyas, a village

External links